Adam Havlík (born January 14, 1991) is a Czech professional ice hockey forward for Orli Znojmo of the Czech 2.liga.

Havlík previously played for Orli in the Czech Extraliga and the Erste Bank Eishockey Liga. He also played for HC Dynamo Pardubice and PSG Berani Zlín as well in the Metal Ligaen for Herning Blue Fox and the Ligue Magnus for Scorpions de Mulhouse.

References

External links

1991 births
Living people
Czech ice hockey forwards
HC Dynamo Pardubice players
SHK Hodonín players
Herning Blue Fox players
HC Nové Zámky players
Orli Znojmo players
People from Znojmo
Ravensburg Towerstars players
Scorpions de Mulhouse players
PSG Berani Zlín players
Sportspeople from the South Moravian Region
Czech expatriate ice hockey players in Germany
Czech expatriate ice hockey players in Slovakia
Czech expatriate sportspeople in Denmark
Czech expatriate sportspeople in France
Czech expatriate sportspeople in Austria
Expatriate ice hockey players in Denmark
Expatriate ice hockey players in France
Expatriate ice hockey players in Austria